Shenango Township can refer to these places in the U.S. state of Pennsylvania:

 Shenango Township, Lawrence County, Pennsylvania
 Shenango Township, Mercer County, Pennsylvania

See also 
 North Shenango Township, Crawford County, Pennsylvania
 South Shenango Township, Crawford County, Pennsylvania
 West Shenango Township, Crawford County, Pennsylvania

Pennsylvania township disambiguation pages